Inspiration is a 1915 American silent drama film directed by George Foster Platt and written by Virginia Tyler Hudson and starring Audrey Munson, an artist's model known at the time for posing for several statues in New York City and the 1915 San Francisco Panama–Pacific International Exposition. It is believed to be one of the first non-pornographic American films to feature full nudity, with Munson frequently appearing naked as a sculptor's model. On its reissue in 1918, the film was renamed as The Perfect Model.

Plot 
A young sculptor searches for the perfect model to inspire his work. He finds a poverty-stricken girl who he thinks is the one he has been 
looking for. When she wanders off, he visits all the famous statues in Manhattan hoping to find her again.

Cast 

 Audrey Munson as The Model
 Thomas A. Curran as The Artist
 George Marlo as The Artist's friend
 Bert Delaney as The Artist's friend
 Carey L. Hastings
 Ethyle Cooke
 Louise Emerald Bates

Release
For Inspiration, Thanhouser hired a lookalike named Jane Thomas to do Munson's acting scenes, while Munson did the scenes where she posed nude. The film was released on November 18, 1915. Thanhouser's publicity department issued a press statement titled "Inspiration, a Study in Thanhouser Ideals", an interview some newspapers captioned in terms that implied that the studio advocated nudity in motion pictures. Producer Edwin Thanhouser wrote a letter to the editor of The Morning Telegraph to correct that impression: "I wish to state that our five-reel Mutual Masterpiece Inspiration was viewed and passed on by the National Board of Censorship without a single alteration."

Issuing a pass on Inspiration resulted in changes to the Board. Although the Board had passed the film without any recommended cuts, members criticized the decision, charging the Board with laxness in that Inspiration had been approved too readily. At a meeting on February 24, 1916, the Board announced that, in the future, films with nudity would "receive the most critical consideration" and passed only if the nudity was "an essential element of a drama the nature of which warrants such presentation."

Reception

"Inspiration presents a decided novelty, for it is the first moving picture in which the nude figure of a woman has been used for artistic reasons only," wrote The Morning Telegraph, which reported Munson's credentials as one of the most famous artist's models in the United States. "Miss Munson's classic beauty and her remarkable poise absolutely remove every suggestion of the objectionable," wrote the reviewer. "George Foster Platt, who directed the picture, has used the utmost delicacy producing the picture, and it would have to be a very prudish person who could find any serious objection to the film. The story is too insignificant to sustain the interest for five reels, but the many beautiful poses of Miss Munson will do more than make up for the lack of a good plot. The picture will attract more than usual interest and the delicate and attractive way that a difficult subject has been filmed will no doubt receive the praise it deserves."

Likewise, a reviewer for The Moving Picture World regarded the story as "slight and conventional", while another credited the film for "presenting a conventional but reasonably diverting story. … Moreover, it may be noted in favor of Inspiration that it possesses an artistic, and at times, even an educational value. Good taste has been displayed in the handling of scenes that might easily become coarse."

Critics praised the third reel of the film, which details the difficult process of molding Munson's body in plaster for the casting of a sculpture.

"At last true art has stepped into the motion field and it is all due to Audrey Munson, the Panama-Pacific model who has gained much fame about of late owing to her shapely figure," wrote Variety. "There is a bit of a story. It is trivial, however. It is about an artist unable to get a satisfactory model. His friends find a country girl who never posed before. She needs the money. She is capable from the minute she starts and immediately wins fame for the sculptor. There is a bit of love mixed in with the model and artist being joined at the altar. After all the posing that girl did that boy took no chance whatever when he married her, for there was nothing hidden from him. It is one nude pose after another. Miss Munson is always the central and bare figure. The picture has an educational trend as well as being artful. This will make some dizzy, but bookers should get busy. It's a cuckoo."

Preservation
No copies of Inspiration are listed in any film archives, suggesting that it is a lost film.

See also
 Nudity in film
 List of lost films

References

External links

 
 Inspiration at Silent Era
 

1915 films
1915 drama films
Silent American drama films
American silent feature films
American black-and-white films
Films set in New York City
Lost American films
Thanhouser Company films
Films about the visual arts
1915 lost films
Lost drama films
Films directed by George Foster Platt
1910s American films